Jonathan Watt (born 11 September 1937) is a former English first-class cricketer.

Born at Eastbourne, Watt made two appearances in first-class cricket match for L. C. Stevens' XI against Cambridge University at Eastbourne in 1960 and 1961. He scored 69 runs across his two matches, with a high score 34.

References

External links

1937 births
Living people
Sportspeople from Eastbourne
English cricketers
L. C. Stevens' XI cricketers